Timur Eriskhanovich Kuriyev (born 1 January 1957; died 14 October 2003 in an automobile accident) was a Russian professional football player and later coach.

References

External links
 

1957 births
Chechen people
2003 deaths
Road incident deaths in Russia
Soviet footballers
Association football defenders
FC Akhmat Grozny players
FC KAMAZ Naberezhnye Chelny players
Russian football managers
FC Akhmat Grozny managers